Dhandar is a union council and a small town in district and tehsil Bhimber Azad Kashmir Pakistan. Located within foothills of Himalayas this town can also be divided into two villages including Dhandar Kalan and Dhandar Khurd.
Dhandar Kalan is a Beautiful Town Located on Barnala Road.

Azad Kashmir